Zwei Choralphantasien (two chorale fantasias), Op. 40, are fantasias for organ by Max Reger.

Background 
Reger was raised Catholic but was fascinated by the variety of melodies of Protestant hymns, and used quotations from them throughout his life. He composed seven chorale fantasias in Weiden between 1898 and 1900, inspired by a fantasia on "Wie schön leuchtet der Morgenstern", Op. 25 (1895) of his teacher Heinrich Reimann. Reger's fantasias follow Reimann's model of setting individual stanzas, connected by interludes. Reger's works often end in a culminating fugue.

No. 1 
The text of the first chorale was written and composed by Philipp Nicolai, published in 1599. Reger composed the fantasia in Erbendorf and Weiden, in September and October 1899, and dedicated it to Friedrich Spitta. It was first performed in Wesel on 24 October 1899 by Karl Straube. Reger described his fantasia as a program music work (Programmmusikwerk). It was the Reger's first chorale fantasias to end with a Choralapotheose (chorale apotheosis), following 19th-century symphonic conclusions.

No. 2 
The text of the second chorale is a paraphrase of Psalm 6 by Johann Georg Albinus. Reger composed the fantasia in Weiden in November and December 1899, dedicated to Paul Gerhardt.

Autographs 
The Max-Reger-Institute holds the autographs of both fantasias.

Editions

References

Bibliography

External links 
 
 Max Reger / 1898 Rückkehr nach Weiden (in German) max-reger-orgel.de
 Chorale Melodies used in Bach's Vocal Works / Straf mich nicht in deinem Zorn, Bach-Cantatas.com
 Max Reger Phantasie über den Choral "Straf' mich nicht in deinem Zorn", Universal Edition
 , Bernhard Schneider, Aegidienkirche, Braunschweig
 , Brian Runnett, Norwich Cathedral

Compositions for organ
Compositions by Max Reger
1900 compositions
Music with dedications